Vavřinec Hradilek (born 10 March 1987) is a Czech slalom canoeist who has competed at the international level since 2003.

Hradilek competed in the 2008 Summer Olympics in Beijing. In the K1 event he finished seventh in the qualification round, thus progressing to the semifinals. In the semifinals he finished eleventh, failing to reach the final round. At the 2012 Summer Olympics in London he won a silver medal in the K1 event. He recorded a time of 94.78 seconds in the final which was only beaten by Daniele Molmenti (93.43 s). He also started in the C2 event with Stanislav Ježek where they finished ninth after being eliminated in the semifinals.

Hradilek won eight medals at the ICF Canoe Slalom World Championships with four golds (K1: 2013; K1 team: 2009, 2015; Extreme K1: 2017), three silvers (K1: 2010, K1 team: 2014, 2019) and a bronze (K1 team: 2007). He also won seven medals at the European Championships (4 golds, 2 silvers and 1 bronze).

World Cup individual podiums

1 Oceania Championship counting for World Cup points
2 Oceania Canoe Slalom Open counting for World Cup points

References

External links

2010 ICF Canoe Slalom World Championships 12 September 2010 K1 men's final results. – accessed 12 September 2010.
12 September 2009 final results for the men's K1 team event at the 2009 ICF Canoe Slalom World Championships. – accessed 12 September 2009.

1987 births
Canoeists at the 2008 Summer Olympics
Canoeists at the 2012 Summer Olympics
Czech male canoeists
Living people
Olympic canoeists of the Czech Republic
Olympic silver medalists for the Czech Republic
Olympic medalists in canoeing
Medalists at the 2012 Summer Olympics
Canoeists from Prague
Medalists at the ICF Canoe Slalom World Championships